The 2019 Hull City Council election took place on 2 May 2019 to elect members of Hull City Council in England. This was on the same day as other nationwide local elections. Following a review of Ward boundaries by the Local Government Boundary Commission for England (LGBCE) the whole council was elected in 2018, the 3rd placed winning candidate at that election is up for re-election in 2019.  The Labour Party are defending overall control of the council.

There were no elections in Bricknell or University wards, being two member wards and not being on this round of the three-year cycle.

This result had the following consequences for the total number of seats on the Council after the elections:

Results summary

Ward results

An asterisk * indicates an incumbent who stood for re-election.

Turnout figures where stated are the number of ballot papers handed out in a ward including any rejected ballot papers.

Avenue

Beverley and Newland

Boothferry

Central

Derringham

Drypool

Holderness

Ings

Kingswood

Longhill and Bilton Grange

Marfleet

Newington and Gipsyville

North Carr

Orchard Park

Pickering

Southcoates

St Andrews and Docklands

Sutton

West Carr

References

Hull City Council elections
2010s in Kingston upon Hull
2019 English local elections
May 2019 events in the United Kingdom